Haileybury is an independent school with campuses in Keysborough, Brighton East, Berwick, Darwin, Northern Territory and Melbourne's CBD. It also has an international campus in the Tianjin outer district of Wuqing, China. Haileybury operates under the model of parallel education, which consists of Haileybury College (a school for boys) and Haileybury Girls College (a school for girls). Haileybury has been described as the largest independent school in Australia.

Haileybury maintains strong relationships with schools in China, Japan, France, Sri Lanka, England, Indonesia and Timor-Leste. Haileybury delivers the VCE program to a number of schools in China and most recently has partnered with the Dili International School.

Haileybury was announced in The Educator as one of Australia's Innovative Schools of 2015 for its work in China. Partnering with 8 schools across the country, 300 graduates are finishing each year in the VCE China Program. As Haileybury brings Australian Secondary Education to China, it is the largest provider in its field.

Associations

Independent Schools Victoria (ISV) 
Associated Public Schools (APS)
Junior School Heads Association of Australia (JSHAA)
Headmasters’ and Headmistresses Conference

History 
Charles Rendall, an alumnus of Haileybury College,  Hertfordshire (1873) and graduate of Oxford University (1879), migrated to Australia in 1882. He quickly established a reputation as an outstanding teacher of Latin and Ancient Greek at Melbourne University, Melbourne Grammar and later at Scotch College. In 1892 with five staff and 17 students he opened his own Haileybury ‘Altera terra’ (in another land) in a 22-room mansion on the corner of New Street and South Road, Brighton, close to the Brighton Beach railway station. Magenta from his old school and black were adopted as school colours. The School was based on the traditional English public school model with a strong emphasis on the classical texts of Ancient Greece and Rome for the mind and cricket for the body and character.

The School offered 12 years of secondary education and averaged 40 to 50 students through the Depression years of the 1890s. Discipline was enforced through the cane and the prefect system. Also on the staff were Mr and Mrs Mills who contributed financially to the founding of the School. Rendall bought them out at the end of 1892 and in 1893 married Louise Fanny Cardweaver, who became school housekeeper. For such a small school Haileybury produced an impressive number of scholars. Equally impressive were the cricket results under Rendall's fierce coaching with successive premierships between 1898 and 1901. Gerry Hazlitt was selected for the Victorian Xl while still at school.

Mr L Berthon had joined Rendall's staff in 1894. Due to Rendall's continuing health problems, especially after 1906, Berthon was often in charge. Although Berthon had a less domineering personality than Rendall both men regarded supportive staff/student relationship as paramount . After Rendall's wife was thrown from the car he was driving and killed, he sold the School to Berthon at the end of 1914. Berthon did not have Rendall's reputation or lofty ambitions, however, and school numbers began to decline. This was compounded by the difficulty of finding good teachers during the war.

It was not all bad news in this period. Gerry Hazlitt had made the Australian Xl in 1907 and toured England in 1912. Another cricket premiership was added in 1911. By 1920 enrolments were rising again and the football team broke through for their premiership. Views of Berthon as a mere caretaker in Rendall's shadow do not do him justice. From the rigors of war he had ensured that the School had emerged intact.

In 1932 the third Headmaster, Mr S Dickinson purchased what was then known as the ‘Castlefield’ Estate, at Hampton.  From 1932 to 1939 the School was carried out at both properties.

A new Headmaster took over in 1942 and with the backing of the church, Sholto Black launched a new era of expansion. By the end of 1942, 190 boys were enrolled at the School and by the time of Mr Black's retirement in 1953 the number of boys had grown to 600.

Mr D Bradshaw became the new Headmaster and continued the expansion of the School. In 1958 Haileybury was invited to join the Associated Public Schools of Victoria.  In 1961 the property ‘Newlands’ was purchased in Keysborough by the School Council and from 1963 to 1968 the Senior School operated at both the Brighton and Keysborough campuses.

Mr M Aikman took over from Bradshaw and continued to develop the Keysborough property. During the 1970s the Preparatory School was built on the ‘Newlands’ site and was to run parallel with the Preparatory School ‘Castlefield, Brighton’ situated in Hampton. In 1985 land was purchased at Berwick to establish a third Preparatory School. In 1989 the ‘Edrington’ campus opened its doors.

Dr R Pargetter took over as Principal in 1998. His blueprint for Haileybury involved the most fundamental changes in the School's history, including the introduction of Parallel Education, a specialised Pre-Senior (Year 9) Program, the broadening of the curriculum and the three-year VCE. Girls first began at Haileybury in 2000 and in 2006 Haileybury Girls College was formally established. Pargetter died in 2007. During his time at Haileybury Pargetter increased student numbers from 1,620 to 3,110.  The first girls graduated from the School later that year, and the Senior Schools opened at ‘Castlefield’ and ‘Edrington’.

Mr Derek Scott was appointed Principal in December 2007.

In 2013 the School opened its first off shore campus just outside Beijing, China.

In 2019, the School opened its first interstate campus, located close to Darwin, Australia, named Haileybury Rendall School. Also in this year, Haileybury was named Australian School of the Year at the Australian Education Awards.

Headmasters & Principals

Crest and Motto
C H Rendall, an Old Boy of Haileybury, England, obtained permission from his old School to use its Name and Badge. The colours he chose were magenta and black instead of the magenta and white of the parent school; and for the motto he chose ‘Altera Terra’ to signify the establishment of a new Haileybury ‘in another land’.

The motto by itself, however, lacked an obvious moral or spiritual significance, which many people believed a school motto should possess.  After careful consideration, it was decided in 1954 to couple the Motto of Haileybury, England, ‘Sursum Corda’ (‘Lift up your hearts’) to the original ‘Altera Terra’.

Campuses and Facilities

Brighton
The Brighton campus is commonly referred to as "Castlefield" and was established in 1932 as another component to the original campus on New Street, Brighton.  The campus consists of an Early Learning Centre, Junior School, Girls Middle School, Boys Middle School and two Pre-Senior Centres. In 2007 the Senior School at Brighton opened.

Keysborough
The Keysborough campus was established in the 1960s and consists of "Newlands" and the Senior School.

"Newlands" has been open since the 1970s but has since undergone major refurbishments. The campus consists of an Early Learning Centre, Junior School, Girls Middle School, Boys Middle School and two Pre-Senior Centres.  The Senior School was established in the 1960s and has undergone major redevelopments since the establishment of Haileybury Girls College in 2006.

The Keysborough campus houses the David Bradshaw Chapel, a concert hall called "Aikman Hall", a newly refurbished library, a lecture theatre, an arts precinct and numerous sporting ovals, hockey fields and tennis courts as well as an Olympic size swimming pool with diving facilities.

Berwick
The Berwick campus is commonly referred to as ‘Edrington’ and officially opened in 1989. The campus consists of an Early Learning Centre, Junior School, Girls Middle School, Boys Middle School and two Pre-Senior Centres.  In 2007 the Senior School at Berwick officially opened. The main assembly hall was named ‘John Twist Hall’ after the school principal at the time.

City
The City campus was opened in 2016 and is the newest Haileybury campus in Victoria. It is located on King St, in Melbourne's CBD. The campus has been labelled as Melbourne's first vertical school, with the building consisting of ten stories with two terrace levels. The campus educates approximately 700 students from pre-school to Year 12. The first cohort of Year 12 students graduated from the campus in 2020.

Darwin
Haileybury Rendall School, named after Haileybury’s founder Charles Rendall, officially opened in 2018. The school consists of three components:
 The largest Indigenous boarding school in Australia with around 150 students
 A day school for 600 students
 An international boarding school.

Curriculum 
Haileybury offers its students the Victorian Certificate of Education (VCE).

Sport 
Haileybury is a member of the Associated Public Schools of Victoria (APS).

APS & AGSV/APS Premierships 
Haileybury has won the following APS and AGSV/APS premierships.

Boys:

 Athletics (8) - 1981, 1982, 1983, 1984, 1988, 1989, 1992, 1993
 Badminton (6) - 2016, 2017, 2018, 2019, 2020, 2021
 Basketball (9) - 1993, 1994, 1996, 1997, 2002, 2003, 2004, 2005, 2021
 Cricket (8) - 1966, 1968, 1985, 1997, 2006, 2007, 2018, 2021
 Cross Country (6) - 1992, 1993, 2008, 2009, 2015, 2019
 Football (11) - 1965, 1970, 1977, 1983, 1987, 2004, 2005, 2006, 2017, 2018, 2019
 Futsal (2) - 2020, 2021
 Hockey (2) - 2004, 2016
 Soccer (7) - 1991, 1992, 1993, 1996, 2005, 2006, 2021
 Swimming (3) - 1987, 1988, 1989
 Swimming & Diving* (6) - 1998, 2004, 2005, 2006, 2007, 2008
 Table Tennis (26) - 1995, 1996, 1997, 1998, 1999, 2000, 2001, 2002, 2004, 2005, 2006, 2007, 2008, 2009, 2010, 2011, 2012, 2013, 2014, 2015, 2016, 2017, 2018, 2019, 2020, 2021
 Tennis (13) - 1987, 1990, 1992, 1997, 1998, 1999, 2002, 2003, 2004, 2005, 2012, 2015, 2020
 Volleyball (4) - 2015, 2017, 2019, 2020
 Water Polo (2) - 2018, 2019

Girls:

 Athletics - 2019
 Badminton (10) - 2007, 2008, 2009, 2010, 2015, 2016, 2017, 2018, 2020, 2021
 Basketball (3) - 2018, 2019, 2021
 Cross Country (3) - 2007, 2009, 2011
 Diving (2) - 2017, 2019
 Hockey (5) - 2013, 2015, 2016, 2019, 2021
 Soccer (7) - 2007, 2008, 2010, 2013, 2016, 2017, 2018
 Softball - 2014
 Swimming & Diving* (4) - 2007, 2008, 2009, 2010
 Tennis (2) - 2015, 2017
 Volleyball (6) - 2007, 2008, 2009, 2011, 2013, 2017
 Water Polo (4) - 2007, 2008, 2009, 2010

*From 1998 until 2013, swimming and diving events were awarded as a single premiership.

Non-APS Sports 
Haileybury also operates a Snow Sports program for secondary students.

Parallel Education
At Haileybury, the parallel education system provides education for boys and girls at the same school, and both genders are allowed to interact outside of class times, where mostly single gender classes exist.

Parallel education at Haileybury incorporates two schools. Haileybury College is a school for boys, and Haileybury Girls College is a school for girls. Each school operates from the Early Learning Centre to Year 12.

How Parallel Education Works;
 Girls and boys attend the same teaching precincts
 Learning and activities are arranged to reflect the age and gender of the student and the nature of the activities
 Students from the Early Learning Centre to Year 4 are educated in coeducational classes
 Years 5 to 9 move to single gender schools at Berwick, Brighton and Keysborough (with separate Pre-Senior Centres)
 The three-year VCE program is conducted with separate classes for girls and boys in English courses, and in other subjects where numbers allow. All other classes are co-educational with students coming together for classes such as music or drama, and in social and cultural activities. However, the Senior School houses are all single-gender, and all relevant events, such as House Athletics, the swimming carnival and House Arts, are conducted in these single-gender houses.

The Haileybury Institute
In mid-December 2012 articles about Haileybury's Explicit Teaching Model, driven by Deputy Principal John Fleming, appeared in The Australian newspaper.

Haileybury's Deputy Principal John Fleming spends four weeks of each term travelling Australia, coaching teachers in using strategies to improve students’ skills. Under the banner of The Haileybury Institute, John Fleming has helped more than 100 schools from all corners of the country and the results have been outstanding. "The first thing I say to schools is we’re aiming to be among the best schools in Australia, we’re not aiming for national minimum benchmarks,"

"We remove all the excuses. Many schools will tell you: ‘But we have indigenous kids, or we have transient kids, or disadvantaged kids’. You quickly get rid of that." John Fleming stated. The program is delivered to hundreds of schools across Australia. "We felt we had something that was best practice in education and there was an opportunity to share it with schools around Australia" stated Principal, Derek Scott.

Prominent Social Commentator and Indigenous Leader, Noel Pearson noted in his article in The Australian that Fleming supports school reform across the nation through The Haileybury Institute.

This program closely fits with Haileybury's extensive Social Justice Program. Many of the schools who participate in John's program are assisted on a pro-bono basis, with education departments helping to cover the costs.

Social Justice
Haileybury places a strong emphasis on social justice through their Community Responsibility Program. Each campus of the School supports local and global charities, with approximately 40 charities benefitting from Haileybury's extensive social justice program.

Students gain a headstrong approach to social responsibility, giving of their time to benefit others through fundraising and ongoing support of global communities in need of their help. Students show constant initiative and leadership towards global crises, and will invent creative fundraising strategies to engage peers to participate and provide aid where they are able.

As part of their social justice program, Haileybury students seek to raise awareness about the not-for-profit organisations they support, and the work these organisations accomplish. Haileybury Berwick's Boys Middle School created a campaign in collaboration with Beyond Blue Youth to tackle the issues surrounding youth depression.

Haileybury has implemented various initiatives to advocate for climate change amongst the student body.

Notable alumni

See also 
 List of schools in Victoria
 List of high schools in Victoria
 List of people educated at Haileybury, Melbourne
 Victorian Certificate of Education
 List of largest Victorian Schools

References and sources

External links 
 
 Old Haileyburians Association
 Haileybury and Imperial Service College, Hertford, England

Associated Public Schools of Victoria
Educational institutions established in 1892
Private secondary schools in Victoria (Australia)
International Baccalaureate schools in Australia
Member schools of the Headmasters' and Headmistresses' Conference
Junior School Heads Association of Australia Member Schools
1892 establishments in Australia
 
Buildings and structures in Melbourne City Centre
Buildings and structures in the City of Casey
Buildings and structures in the City of Bayside
Buildings and structures in the City of Greater Dandenong